The Gulf of Batabanó, also called the Batabanó Gulf, is an inlet or strait off southwestern Cuba in the Caribbean Sea, separating mainland Cuba from the Isle of Youth.

Overview
The northeastern section of the gulf is also called Ensenada de la Broa. The gulf is a center of sponge fishing.

See also

Batabanó
Surgidero de Batabanó

References

External links
Encyclopædia Britannica
Columbia Gazetteer of North America article

Bodies of water of Cuba
Batabano